Clifford Christopher Cocks  (born 28 December 1950) is a British mathematician and cryptographer.
In 1973, while working at the United Kingdom Government Communications Headquarters (GCHQ), he invented a public-key cryptography algorithm equivalent to what would become (in 1977) the RSA algorithm.

The idea was classified information and his insight remained hidden for 24 years, although it was independently invented by Ronald Rivest, Adi Shamir, and Leonard Adleman in 1977. Public-key cryptography using prime factorisation is now part of nearly every Internet transaction.

Education
Cocks was educated at Manchester Grammar School and went on to study the Mathematical Tripos as an undergraduate at King's College, Cambridge. He continued as a PhD student at the University of Oxford, where he specialised in number theory under Bryan Birch, but left academia without finishing his doctorate.

Career

Non-secret encryption

Cocks left Oxford to join Communications-Electronics Security Group (CESG), an arm of GCHQ, in September 1973. Soon after, Nick Patterson told Cocks about James H. Ellis' non-secret encryption, an idea which had been published in 1969 but never successfully implemented. Several people had attempted creating the required one-way functions, but Cocks, with his background in number theory, decided to use prime factorization, and did not even write it down at the time.

With this insight, he quickly developed what later became known as the RSA encryption algorithm.

GCHQ was not able to find a way to use the algorithm, and treated it as classified information. The scheme was also passed to the NSA. With a military focus, financial considerations, and low computing power, the power of public-key cryptography was unrealised in both organisations:
I judged it most important for military use. In a fluid military situation you may meet unforeseen threats or opportunities. 
... if you can share your key rapidly and electronically, you have a major advantage over your opponent.
Only at the end of the evolution from Berners-Lee [in 1989] designing an open internet architecture for CERN, its adaptation and adoption for the Arpanet ... did public key cryptography realise its full potential.
-Ralph Benjamin

In 1977, the algorithm was independently invented and published by Rivest, Shamir and Adleman, who named it after their initials. There is no evidence of a hint or leak, conscious or unconscious, and Cocks has dismissed the idea. 
The British achievement remained secret until 1997.

Public revelation
In 1987, the GCHQ had plans to release the work, but Peter Wright's Spycatcher MI5 memoir caused them to delay revealing the research by ten years.
24 years after its discovery, on 18 December 1997, Cocks revealed the GCHQ history of public-key research in a public talk. James Ellis had died on 25 November 1997, a month before the public announcement was made.

Identity-based encryption
In 2001, Cocks developed one of the first secure  identity-based encryption (IBE) schemes, based on assumptions about quadratic residues in composite groups.  The Cocks IBE scheme is not widely used in practice due to its high degree of ciphertext expansion.  However, it is currently one of the few IBE schemes which do not use bilinear pairings, and rely for security on more well-studied mathematical problems.

Awards and honours
In 1968, Cocks won a silver medal at the 10th International Mathematical Olympiad.

Cocks held the post of Chief Mathematician at GCHQ. He established the Heilbronn Institute for Mathematical Research at the University of Bristol.

Cocks was made a Companion of the Order of the Bath in 2008 (the citation describes him as "Counsellor, Foreign and Commonwealth Office"). He was awarded an honorary degree from the University of Bristol in 2008, and an honorary Doctor of Science from the University of Birmingham in 2015.

With James Ellis and Malcolm Williamson, Cocks was honoured for his part in the development of public-key cryptography by the Institute of Electrical and Electronics Engineers (IEEE) in 2010 and by induction into the Cryptologic Hall of Honor in 2021.

Cocks was elected a Fellow of the Royal Society (FRS) in 2015. His certificate of election reads:

References

1950 births
Living people
People educated at Manchester Grammar School
Alumni of King's College, Cambridge
GCHQ cryptographers
Public-key cryptographers
Modern cryptographers
Fellows of the Royal Society
Companions of the Order of the Bath
International Mathematical Olympiad participants